The West Asian Tennis Federation (WATF) also known as ITF West Asia (International Tennis Federation West Asia) is a subzone of the ATF consisting of countries from West Asia.

Member nations

References

External links
WATF

Tennis organizations
Tennis in Asia
Western Asia